Lorenz Hackenholt (26 June 1914  missing 1945, declared legally dead as of 31 December 1945, but believed to have still been alive) was a member of the Schutzstaffel (SS) with the rank of Hauptscharführer (First Sergeant). During World War II Hackenholt built and operated the gas chamber at the Bełżec extermination camp in occupied Poland. In so doing, he personally carried out the murder of hundreds of thousands of people.

Hackenholt was deeply involved in the operation of death camps during the deadliest phase of the Holocaust in Poland, known as Operation Reinhard, as well as in other Nazi war crimes, including the murder of mental patients and the disabled in Action T4 programme of forced euthanasia.

Life 
Hackenholt's full name was Laurenzius Marie Hackenholt. He was born on 26 June 1914 in Gelsenkirchen/Ruhr. His father was Theodor Hackenholt and his mother was Elizabeth Wobriezek. He attended the local elementary school until he reached the age of 14. He then became an apprentice bricklayer. After he passed the trade examination he worked on various building sites.

Concentration camp guard 
In 1933, Hackenholt volunteered for the SS. After joining the SS he was sent to a training school on 1 January 1934. After that he volunteered for service in the army, where he was assigned to the 12th Engineers' Battalion. After two years military service he was discharged, and then joined the SS Death's Head troops. He was a skilled driver and mechanic and, beginning in March 1938, served at Sachsenhausen concentration camp in the motor pool. He also worked as a guard at Sachsenhausen.

Action T4 

Aktion T4, the so-called "Euthanasia Program", lasted from early 1940 until the summer of 1941 when the gassings were stopped on Hitler's orders. In November 1939 Hackenholt was assigned to Action T4, when he was transferred to Berlin for 'special duty'. This special duty was under Viktor Brack. According to Werner Karl Dubois, another camp guard transferred to special duty with Hackenholt:

There were six T4 killing facilities. Hackenholt served in all of them. He drove a bus with the SS staff from facility to facility. He also removed the bodies from the gas chambers and burned them. For a while Hackenholt was a driver for SS-Untersturmführer Dr. August Becker, the T4 chemist who was responsible for delivering bottled carbon monoxide gas from I.G. Farben manufacturing plants to the T4 gas chambers. Hackenholt worked primarily in Grafeneck and Sonnenstein.

Operation Reinhard and beyond 

In the fall of 1941, some of the Action T4 personnel, including Hackenholt, were transferred to Lublin Reservation in occupied Poland where they came under the authority of SS-Brigadeführer Odilo Globocnik. On vacation leave, Hackenholt went to Berlin to marry Ilse Zillmer, who was then 29 years old. Hackenholt returned to Poland and was sent to Bełżec, a remote labour camp near the rail station, to conduct experiments to establish a method for the mass-murder of Jews by gassing. Hackenholt set up three gas chambers in an insulated barracks. Using engine exhaust, piped into the chambers from a disassembled Soviet tank, Hackenholt murdered over 50,000 Jews in one month (mid March to mid April 1942). In August 1942, Hackenholt built and operated newer and larger gas chambers at Belzec. Once Belzec came into operation, a sign was placed over the gas chambers which said "Hackenholt Foundation"; with potted geraniums on either side of the entrance. Hackenholt also designed and operated gas chambers at the Treblinka and Sobibor extermination camps.

Hackenholt, who was called "Hacko" by other guards, was a tough, large man who was willing and able to do any task at the extermination camps, although he reportedly balked at cleaning up seeping corruption from bodies rotting in mass graves. At Belzec, where all ages of people were murdered, some Jews, because of infirmity or age, could not enter the gas chamber. These people were instead laid down in the mass graves, and, according to the testimony of other guards, shot by Hackenholt. In 1943, when Himmler ordered the mass graves at Belzec to be reopened and the bodies burned, Hackenholt was in charge of the operation. Himmler considered Hackenholt to be "one of the most deserving men of Operation Reinhard".

In December 1943, Hackenholt and other personnel from Operation Reinhard were transferred to northern Italy (Trieste), where they attempted to find and murder the few remaining Italian Jews. In 1944 Hackenholt was awarded the Iron Cross (Second Class) for his role in Operation Reinhard.

Colleagues from Einsatz R were last seen in Austria at the time of his unit's retreat. On the way to Kirbach, their car column had to supposedly avoid a horse-drawn dairy car driven by Hackenholt...

In the summer of 1945, Rudolf Kamm, an essayist from the Bełżec crew, was to report to Hackenholt's wife Ilse (née Zillmer, b. 1912), who was in Berlin at the time. He claimed that Hackenholt sent him to his wife to give him civilian clothes through him.

1945 disappearance and investigation 
Hackenholt was supposedly killed in Italy in 1945, possibly by execution for selling guns to the partisans. However, this was never quite certain. Hackenholt disappeared after 1945  and, based on an application by his wife, was declared dead by a Berlin court on 1 April 1954, with an official date of death of 31 December 1945. At the end of July 1959, the Headquarters for the Investigation of National Socialist Crimes in Ludwigsburg in West Germany opened an investigation into the crimes committed in Bełżec. They were able to locate Hackenholt's wife and mother. Both certified that Hackenholt had not been heard from since the war, and surveillance of the wife's residence showed there were no attempts by him to visit her there.

Post-1946 
Hackenholt's brother, Theo, testified that in 1946 he saw him on the road from Dortmund to Gelsenkirchen. In 1961, the West German police were able to find Hermann Erich Bauer, who had been in the SS with Hackenholt. Bauer claimed that Hackenholt had definitely survived the war, because he had met him in 1946 near Ingolstadt, Bavaria, where he allegedly worked as a driver or courier. He also claimed that Hackenholt had become a slain Wehrmacht soldier named Jansen, Jensen or Johannsen and lived with a woman he had met in Trieste. The West German police conducted an investigation but were not able to locate Hackenholt, or to determine whether he might still be alive. West German investigators took seriously the reports that Hackenholt may still be at large: they searched the homes of his wife and mother, interrogated his former friends from the time of service in the SS. Archives and records of offences were examined, as well as numerous inquiries to potential witnesses to determine whether a driver named Jansen or similar was working in the Ingolstadt area. Up to 90,000 people have been tested. Licence applications submitted near Ingolstadt between 1945 and 1947 had their contents compared with photos of Hackenholt and samples of his writing. However, several years of police searching did not produce any official results. British researcher Michael Tregenza spent many years exploring Hackenholt's postwar whereabouts and was repeatedly warned against looking for him. Tregenza believed that Hackenholt had survived the war and was living under a false name somewhere in Germany.

See also 
List of fugitives from justice who disappeared

Notes

References 
Bryant, Michael S.: Eyewitness to Genocide: The Operation Reinhard Death Camp Trials, 1955–1966. Knoxville: The University of Tennessee Press, 2014. .
 Klee, Ernst, Dressen, Willi, and Riess, Volker, eds. "The Good Old Days" -- The Holocaust as Seen by its Perpetrators and Bystanders, MacMillan, New York 1991 (translation by Deborah Burnstone) 
 Tregenza, Michael, "The ‘Disappearance’ of SS-Hauptscharfuhrer Lorenz Hackenholt -- A Report on the 1959-63 West German Police Search for Lorenz Hackenholt, the Gas Chamber Expert of the Aktion Reinhard Extermination Camps", 2000, at Mazel on-line library
Webb, Chris: The Belzec death camp. History, Biographies, Remembrance. Stuttgart: ibidem-Verlag, 2016. .

1914 births
1945 deaths
Aktion T4 personnel
Belzec extermination camp personnel
Fugitives
Waffen-SS personnel killed in action
Holocaust perpetrators in Italy
Holocaust perpetrators in Poland
People declared dead in absentia
People from Gelsenkirchen
People from the Province of Westphalia
Sachsenhausen concentration camp personnel
Sobibor extermination camp personnel
SS non-commissioned officers
Treblinka extermination camp personnel